The 2017 Coprus Christi mayoral special election was held on May 6, 2017 to elect the mayor of Corpus Christi, Texas. It was held following the resignation of Dan McQueen. It saw the election of Joe McComb.

Results

References 

Corpus Christi
Corpus Christi
Mayoral elections in Corpus Christi, Texas
Non-partisan elections
Corpus Christi 2017
Corpus Christi